Michelle Brunner (31 December 1953 – 24 June 2011) was a British bridge player, writer and teacher. She was a member of the British team that won the 1985 Venice Cup, the biennial world championship for women national teams.

She also finished second once and third twice in the quadriennial World Team Olympiad, women flight. As of September 2011 she held historic rank 24 among European Grand Masters, Women category. (Female players commonly have rankings and may be grand masters in the open category too.)

Death
Brunner was diagnosed with metastatic breast cancer in 2007 and died on 24 June 2011 at age 57.

Early life
Born in London, Brunner attended the Henrietta Barnett School in Hampstead Garden Suburb, London, where she learned and practised her bridge playing skills during her sixth form years.

Following this, she went to Manchester University where she read Italian and French, but her increasing involvement in bridge meant that she left without getting her degree to work in the travel industry for Thomas Cook for seventeen years. At university, she met and played with John Holland, who would also become an international player. He soon became her partner in life as well as in bridge, and they married in 2008.

Bridge career
Brunner was a World Bridge Federation Life Master and an English Bridge Union (EBU) Premier Grand Master.

Her Venice Cup win in 1985 was achieved as partner to Gill Scott-Jones on the Great Britain team. However the pair did not play enough boards to qualify for the title of World Champions. In 1980 she and Pat Davies were part of the Great Britain team that finished third in the World Team Olympiad, but the pair did not play enough boards to qualify for bronze medals.

In 1988 the Great Britain team finished second and Brunner, as partner to Sandra Landy, did earn the silver medal. In 2004, she was part of the England team in the Olympiad which finished third, and received a bronze medal partnering Rhona Goldenfield.

In mixed and women's events she won gold and bronze medals in the Common Market Championships and gold, silver and bronze in the European Championships. Partnering John Holland, she was part of three England teams which won the Camrose Trophy. Brunner was also in winning teams in the Lady Milne competition, the equivalent of the Camrose Trophy for women teams, on seven occasions.

She turned professional in 1995, when she launched her Mobile School of Bridge. Brunner taught beginning and intermediate players until 2006. She did private teaching, as well as offering her services as a professional partner. As well as writing articles for bridge magazines, she wrote two books. According to Tom Townsend, she was "one of Manchester's best-loved teachers and players".

Publications

Books
  192 pp.
  192 pp.

Pamphlets
 Practise Your Avoidance Plays (Bisley: Bridge Plus, 2001) 16 pp.

References

External links
 
 

1953 births
2011 deaths
British and Irish contract bridge players 
English contract bridge players
Bridge players from London
Venice Cup players
Contract bridge writers
Writers from London
Deaths from breast cancer
Deaths from cancer in England
Place of death missing